The 2002–03 Maryland Terrapins men's basketball team represented the University of Maryland in the 2002–2003 college basketball season as a member of the Atlantic Coast Conference (ACC). They advanced to the Sweet Sixteen in the 2003 NCAA basketball tournament.

2002–03 was the inaugural season of basketball at the Comcast Center. The team was coached by Gary Williams.

Roster

Schedule 

|-
!colspan=6|Regular Season

|-
!colspan=6|ACC Tournament

|-
!colspan=6|NCAA Tournament

Rankings

References

Maryland Terrapins men's basketball seasons
Maryland
Maryland
Maryland
Maryland